The Corona México 200 presented by Banamex is a discontinued NASCAR Nationwide Series stock car race held at the Autódromo Hermanos Rodríguez road course in Mexico City, Mexico. The inaugural race was held in 2005 and the final race was held in 2008. The 2005 race marked the first time that NASCAR had run a Busch Series race on a road course since 2001, and at one time the Mexico City race was one of three road races on the Busch/Nationwide circuit (joining races at Watkins Glen and Montreal).

Much attention was directed towards this race, as it was the first NASCAR points-paying race outside the United States since 1952.  The only recent international races for NASCAR had been those at the Suzuka Circuit and Twin Ring Motegi (1996–1998) in Japan, but the races were non-points-paying exhibition races. In 1952, NASCAR sanctioned points-paying races on the Canadian side of Niagara Falls.

The Autódromo Hermanos Rodríguez track is a very popular track for open-wheel racing such as Formula One and Champ Car, however the course needed some work to make it suitable for stock cars.  The most notable difference was a chicane on the pit straight, and also the addition of a link to eliminate Curva Héctor Rebaque, instead adding a long, curve between the track's short circuit curve and Ese del Lago. This move was made because of the heavy braking of the heavier cars.  Unlike the Champ Car race, however, the cars do not use the chicane at Peraltada. In 2007 the cars no longer used the frontstretch "Bus stop chicane".

2005 Telcel-Motorola 200
Tickets sales were good, and fans packed the track after the announcement that several local drivers would drive NASCAR entries normally driven by other drivers.  Among them was open-wheel star Adrián Fernández, Jorge Goeters, Mara Reyes (a female driver), Carlos Contreras, and Michel Jourdain Jr. who had just moved to NASCAR from Champ Car.

Jorge Goeters won the pole position for the event, with a lap average speed of 103.366 mph.  Goeters led the NASCAR field for the first twenty-four laps, but Martin Truex Jr., then moved into the lead for several laps. The home crowd roared loudly when he was displaced by Mexico native Adrián Fernández, who led for several laps before giving up the lead to Truex, who went on to win the race. Top Mexican native finisher was Fernández, who finished tenth.  Pole winner Jorge Goeters finished thirty-eighth after engine failure.  Reyes finished thirty-fifth, Contreras thirty-sixth, and Jourdain thirty-seventh.

2006 Telcel-Motorola 200
Denny Hamlin took his first Busch Series win with an impressive performance at the track. Road-course ringer Boris Said made another fine visit to take second place after providing Hamlin with his stiffest challenge. After his third top-five finish from six Busch starts, Said admitted: "We just got beat. Denny Hamlin's the real deal."

Kyle Busch had looked like a victory contender but angered the home crowd, when he hit local driver Michel Jourdain Jr. following a rash move into turn eight. Jourdain was out on the spot, and Busch dropped down to seventh. Third place went to the points leader, Kevin Harvick, with J. J. Yeley in fourth and Paul Menard fifth. Post-race, Marc Goossens, who made his Busch series debut in the No. 90 Robert Yates car, was lauded for leading 2 laps during the event and coming home in the 9th position.

2007 Telcel-Motorola Mexico 200
Juan Pablo Montoya took his first Busch Series win. Defending race winner Denny Hamlin seemed to be the only one who could give the Colombia native a run for his money and settled for second.

The win was bittersweet for Montoya and his team, as with only 9 laps to go, Montoya's teammate, Scott Pruett driving the No. 41 Dodge, attempted to block Montoya, who had fresher tires. As the two drove into turn one, Pruett moved down low, and Montoya did not back off, spinning Pruett and forcing many drivers into the grass. Third went to road course ace Boris Said; in fourth was new points leader Carl Edwards (due to Kevin Harvick not being in the race), and Pruett would come back from the 17th position to round out the top five.

The collision with Pruett came at the climax of an impressive drive by Montoya.  On his final scheduled pit stop at lap 44, a failure in the overflow valve in the refuelling system prevented his team from filling his fuel tank, requiring an additional stop on lap 54 to repair the problem and top off the fuel tank, with his returning to the track in 19th place.  Montoya then took advantage of his having fresher tires than anyone else to move up to second place within fifteen laps, despite his advance being slowed by a number of full-course cautions, putting him in position to pass Pruett, leading to the incident mentioned above.

Pruett was not pleased with his teammate post-race, stating "That was nasty dirty driving."

2008 Corona Mexico 200
In the farewell running of the Mexico City race, the renamed Corona Mexico 200 was an action-filled race. Because of the unique layout of the course, road course ringers were prominent in the field, such as Scott Pruett, Boris Said, Patrick Carpentier, Adrian Fernandez, DJ Kennington, Michel Jourdain Jr., Chris Cook, and Kevin O'Connell.

The pole sitter was Colin Braun in Roush-Fenway Racing's No. 16 Ford. Starting second was road course ringer Scott Pruett. Pruett was looking to avenge his heartbreaking loss the previous season. The race saw a couple of the road course ringers in contention for the win. Pruett led the most laps and was the class of the whole field. He proceeded to lead 36 of the 80 laps, giving up the lead only during pit stop cycles and small green-flag runs. Australian second-year driver Marcos Ambrose was involved in a heated incident with Boris Said when he wrecked Said on a restart. Boris replied by pointing the finger at Ambrose during the resulting caution and vowing retaliation. Kyle Busch passed Pruett with 7 laps to go to win the race, while Ambrose finished 2nd.

Past winners

2007: Race extended due to a green–white–checker finish.

References

External links
 

Former NASCAR races
NASCAR Xfinity Series races
NASCAR races at Autódromo Hermanos Rodríguez